This is a list of battalions of the Black Watch, which existed as an infantry regiment of the British Army from 1881 to 2006.

Original composition
When the 42nd (Royal Highland) Regiment of Foot amalgamated with the 73rd (Perthshire) Regiment of Foot, to become the Black Watch (Royal Highlanders) in 1881 under the Cardwell-Childers reforms of the British Armed Forces, seven pre-existent militia and volunteer battalions of Fifeshire, Forfarshire, and Perthshire were integrated into the structure of the regiment. Volunteer battalions had been created in reaction to a perceived threat of invasion by France in the late 1850s. Organised as "rifle volunteer corps", they were independent of the British Army and composed primarily of the middle class.

Reorganisation

The Territorial Force (later Territorial Army) was formed in 1908, which the volunteer battalions joined, while the militia battalions transferred to the "Special Reserve".

First World War

The Black Watch fielded 25 battalions and lost 8,390 officers and other ranks during the course of the war. The regiment's territorial components formed duplicate second and third line battalions. As an example, the three-line battalions of the 5th Black Watch were numbered as the 1/5th, 2/5th, and 3/5th respectively. Many battalions of the regiment were formed as part of Secretary of State for War Lord Kitchener's appeal for an initial 100,000 men volunteers in 1914. They were referred to as the New Army or Kitchener's Army. The Volunteer Training Corps were raised with overage or reserved occupation men early in the war, and were initially self-organised into many small corps, with a wide variety of names. Recognition of the corps by the authorities brought regulation and as the war continued the small corps were formed into battalion sized units of the county Volunteer Regiment. In 1918 these were linked to county regiments.

Inter-War
By 1920, all of the regiment's war-raised battalions had disbanded. The Black Watch did not, however, return to its original peacetime size; half of its territorial battalions were lost to amalgamation shortly after the war ended. The Special Reserve reverted to its militia designation in 1921, then to the Supplementary Reserve in 1924; however, its battalions were effectively placed in 'suspended animation'. As World War II approached, the Territorial Army was reorganised in the mid-1930s, many of its infantry battalions were converted to other roles, especially anti-aircraft.

Second World War
The Black Watch's expansion during the Second World War was modest compared to 1914–1918. National Defence Companies were combined to create a new "Home Defence" battalion. In addition to this, 22 battalions of the Home Guard across Perthshire, Fife, Angus, Dundee and Kinross-shire were affiliated to the regiment, wearing its cap badge, and also by 1944 one rocket battery (Z Battery). Due to the daytime (or shift working) occupations of these men, the batteries required eight times the manpower of an equivalent regular battery. A number of Light Anti-Aircraft (LAA) troops were formed from the local battalions to defend specific points, such as factories.

Post-World War II

In the immediate post-war period, the army was significantly reduced: nearly all infantry regiments had their first and second battalions amalgamated and the Supplementary Reserve disbanded.

Amalgamation
The 2003 Defence White Paper, titled Delivering Security in a Changing World, set out the future structure of the British military, one of the points being that the single-battalion regiments would be amalgamated into large, multi-battalion regiments. All of the Scottish regiments were amalgamated to form the 7 battalion strong Royal Regiment of Scotland.

References

Black Watch, List of battalions
Black Watch
Black Watch
Battalions